Sevier County is the name of several counties in the United States:

 Sevier County, Arkansas
 Sevier County, Tennessee
 Sevier County, Utah